The 2022 Purdue Boilermakers football team represented Purdue University in the West Division of the Big Ten Conference for the 2022 NCAA Division I FBS football season. Jeff Brohm was in his sixth season as the team's head coach. The Boilermakers played their home games at Ross–Ade Stadium in West Lafayette, Indiana. Purdue finished the season 8–4, 6–3 in Big Ten play to win the West division. As a result, they received a bid to the Big Ten Championship Game for the first time in program history, where they lost to Michigan. They received a bid to the Citrus Bowl where they lost to LSU.

On December 7, 2022, head coach Jeff Brohm accepted the head coach position at his alma mater Louisville. His brother and Purdue offensive coordinator Brian Brohm served as interim head coach for the Boilermakers during the Citrus Bowl. On December 13, 2022, the school named former Illinois defensive coordinator Ryan Walters the team's new head coach. Walters will be the fourth youngest head football coach at the NCAA Division I FBS level.

Previous season

The Boilermakers finished the 2021 season 9–4, 6–3 in Big Ten play to finish in a three-way tie for second place in the West division.  They finished the season with a 48–45 overtime victory over Tennessee in the Music City Bowl.

Offseason

Coaching changes
On January 5, 2022, Brad Lambert accepted a defensive coordinator position at Wake Forest. Two weeks later, cornerbacks coach James Adams followed Lambert to Wake Forest, while JaMarcus Shephard accepted an assistant coaching position at Washington.  Assistant offensive line coach Neil Callaway also announced his retirement following the 2021 season.

To replace these coaches, former Western Kentucky head coach and recent Purdue quality control coach David Elson was hired as linebacker coach, former UAB coach Garrick McGee was brought in as wide receiver coach, and Ashton Youboty was hired as the cornerbacks coach.  Ryan Wallace was also promoted to assistant offensive line coach.

Transfers
Outgoing

Notable departures from the 2021 squad included:

Incoming

Preseason

Recruits
The Boilermakers signed a total of 19 recruits.

Schedule 
The 2022 schedule consists of 6 home and 6 away games in the regular season.

Game summaries

Penn State

Indiana State

at Syracuse

Florida Atlantic

at No. 21 Minnesota

at Maryland

Nebraska

at Wisconsin

Iowa

at No. 21 Illinois

Northwestern

at Indiana

vs. No. 2 Michigan (Big Ten Championship)

vs. No. 17 LSU (Citrus Bowl)

Rankings

Roster

Wide receiver Milton Wright was ruled academically ineligible for the 2022 season.

2022 NFL Draft

Boilermakers who were picked in the 2022 NFL Draft:

Awards and honors

Award watch lists
Listed in the order that they were released

Weekly Awards

All-Conference Honors

References

Purdue
Purdue Boilermakers football seasons
Purdue Boilermakers football